Geva (lit. Hill) is a kibbutz in the Jezreel Valley in Israel. Located near the city of Afula, it falls under the jurisdiction of Gilboa Regional Council.

History
Geva was founded in 1921 by Jewish immigrants from Poland and Russia as the second and third wave of immigration. By 1948 it had a population of 439, which had grown to 506 at the end of 1951.

The Gevatron singing troupe was established by members of Geva in 1948. It recorded over 20 albums. At the peak of its popularity in the 1980s, the troupe appeared at Yarkon Park in Tel Aviv before an audience of 120,000. It collaborated with some of Israel's leading singers, among them Yoram Gaon, Shoshana Damari and Yehudit Ravitz. In 1972, the Gevatron won the David's Harp prize, in 1992 it won the Histadrut prize, and in 2008, it won the Israel Prize.

Notable people
Shimon Peres (1923–2016), former Israeli prime minister and president

References

External links

Official website

Kibbutzim
Kibbutz Movement
Gilboa Regional Council
Populated places established in 1922
Populated places in Northern District (Israel)
Polish-Jewish culture in Israel
Russian-Jewish culture in Israel
1922 establishments in Mandatory Palestine